The Division of Barker is an Australian Electoral Division in the south-east of South Australia. The division was established on 2 October 1903, when South Australia's original single multi-member division was split into seven single-member divisions.  It is named for Collet Barker, an early explorer of the region at the mouth of the Murray River. The 63,886 km² seat currently stretches from Morgan in the north to Port MacDonnell in the south, taking in the Murray Mallee, the Riverland, the Murraylands and most of the Barossa Valley, and includes the towns of Barmera, Berri, Bordertown, Coonawarra, Keith, Kingston SE, Loxton, Lucindale, Mannum, Millicent, Mount Gambier, Murray Bridge, Naracoorte, Penola, Renmark, Robe, Tailem Bend, Waikerie, and parts of Nuriootpa and Tanunda.

Geography
Since 1984, federal electoral division boundaries in Australia have been determined at redistributions by a redistribution committee appointed by the Australian Electoral Commission. Redistributions occur for the boundaries of divisions in a particular state, and they occur every seven years, or sooner if a state's representation entitlement changes or when divisions of a state are malapportioned.

History

Barker is the only one of South Australia's remaining original six divisions that has never been held by the Australian Labor Party and is traditionally the safest seat for the Liberal Party of Australia in the state. It has been in the hands of the Liberals and its predecessors for its entire existence, except for a six-year period when Country Party MP Archie Cameron held it; however, Cameron joined the United Australia Party, direct forerunner of the Liberals, in 1940.  The conservative parties have usually had a secure hold on the seat.  This tradition has only been threatened three times. Labor came within 1.2 percent of winning the seat at the 1929 election, and within 1.7 percent of winning the seat at the 1943 election.  In the latter election, Barker was left as the only non-Labor seat in South Australia, and indeed the only Coalition seat outside the eastern states. It would be seven decades before the conservatives' hold on Barker would be seriously threatened again.

Though it has always covered the state's entire south-east, Barker was historically a hybrid urban-rural seat that extended for some distance into the Adelaide area.  Until 1949, only three seats--Adelaide, Boothby and Hindmarsh—were based primarily on the capital. For most of the first half-century after Federation, Barker included Glenelg and the Holdfast Bay area, and at times stretched as far as the western metropolitan suburbs of Keswick and Henley Beach. However, it became an entirely rural seat after parliament was expanded in the redistribution prior to the 1949 election, making this already strongly conservative seat even more so. Barker had always included Kangaroo Island and the connecting Fleurieu Peninsula until parliament was expanded in the redistribution prior to the 1984 election. Exchanged between Barker and Mayo since, Kangaroo Island and the Fleurieu Peninsula have been in Mayo since the redistribution prior to the 2004 election, where the massive redistribution of Wakefield, resulting from the abolition of Bonython, saw Barker absorb the Riverland from Wakefield.

The seat's most prominent members have been Cameron, a former leader of the Country Party and later Speaker of the House in the Menzies Government, Jim Forbes, a minister in the Menzies, Holt, Gorton and McMahon governments, and Ian McLachlan, Minister for Defence from 1996 to 1998 in the Howard Government.

2016 election
South Australian Senator Nick Xenophon confirmed in December 2014 that by mid-2015 the Nick Xenophon Team (NXT) would announce candidates in all states and territories at the 2016 election, with Xenophon citing the government's ambiguity on the Collins-class submarine replacement project as motivation. ABC psephologist Antony Green's 2016 federal election guide for South Australia stated NXT had a "strong chance of winning lower house seats and three or four Senate seats".

A ReachTEL seat-level opinion poll in the safe Liberal seat of Barker of 869 voters conducted by robocall on 20 June during the 2016 election campaign surprisingly found NXT candidate James Stacey leading the Liberals' Tony Pasin 52–48 on the two-candidate preferred vote. Seat-level opinion polls in the other two rural Liberal South Australian seats revealed NXT also leading in both Grey and Mayo.

Election-night counting showed that Stacey was second to Pasin on first preferences, however the indicative two-candidate preferred count had been done between Pasin and Labor candidate Mat O'Brien, which meant there was no early indication of whether Stacey would receive enough preferences to beat Pasin before postal, absentee and provisional votes were counted and preferences distributed in the following two weeks. Ultimately, it was confirmed that Stacey had not only overtaken O'Brien on first preferences, but reduced Pasin's margin in Barker to 4.7 percent—thus making Barker a marginal seat for the first time since Cameron's near-defeat in the 1943 landslide.  However, Barker remains a comfortably safe Liberal seat in a "traditional" two-party matchup with Labor; Pasin only suffered a one-percent swing against Labor.

Members

Election results

References
 ABC profile for Barker: 2016
 Poll Bludger profile for Barker: 2016
 AEC profile for Barker: 2016

Notes

External links
 SA boundary map, 2001: AEC
 SA boundary map, 1984: Atlas SA

Electoral divisions of Australia
Constituencies established in 1903
1903 establishments in Australia